The 2009 FIVB Volleyball Men's Junior World Championship was held in Pune, India from 31 July to 9 August 2009. Brazil won the tournament after defeating Cuba 3-2 in the final. Maurício Borges Silva was elected the Most Valuable Player.

Pools composition

Venues
 Balewadi Sports Complex – Badminton Hall, Pune, India – Pool A, C, E, F, 1st–4th places and 5th–8th places
 Balewadi Sports Complex – Boxing Hall, Pune, India – Pool B, D, G, H, 9th–12th places and 13th–16th places

First round
All times are Indian Standard Time (UTC+05:30).

Pool A

|}

|}

Pool B

|}

|}

Pool C

|}

|}

Pool D

|}

|}

Second round

Pool E (1st–8th)

|}

|}

Pool F (1st–8th)

|}

|}

Pool G (9th–16th)

|}

|}

Pool H (9th–16th)

|}

|}

Final round

13th–16th places bracket

|}

|}

|}

9th–12th places bracket

|}

|}

|}

5th–8th places bracket

|}

|}

|}

Championship bracket

Semifinals

|}

3rd place

|}

Final

|}

Final standing

Awards

Most Valuable Player
  Maurício Borges Silva
Best Scorer
  Levan Kalandadze
Best Spiker
  Farhad Ghaemi
Best Blocker
  Renan Buiatti

Best Server
  Raja Manidurai
Best Setter
  Leandro Macías
Best Libero
  Franco López

References

External links
Official website

World Men's U21 Championship
Volleyball
Volleyball
FIVB Volleyball Men's U21 World Championship
July 2009 sports events in India
August 2009 sports events in India